"Wind the Bobbin Up" is an English language children's nursery rhyme and singing game.

Lyrics 
Among modern lyrics is:

Wind the bobbin up,
Wind the bobbin up,
Pull, pull, clap, clap, clap.
Wind it back again,
Wind it back again,
Pull, pull, clap, clap, clap,
Point to the ceiling,
Point to the floor,
Point to the window,
Point to the door,
Clap your hands together, 1, 2, 3,
And place them gently upon your knee.

Origins
Iona and Peter Opie traced this rhyme back to Netherlands in the 1890s. When they were collecting games in the 1960s and 1970s the version they encountered was:

Wind the bobbin up,
Wind the bobbin up,
Pull, pull,
Tug, tug, tug.

The game
In the 1970s the game involved two players winding fists around each other. At "Pull, Pull" they pushed their fists away from each other and when "Tug, Tug" was reached they  pulled their elbows back. It has now become a much more sedate action game, often with small children carrying out the actions in the lyrics.

See also 

List of nursery rhymes

Notes

English folk songs
English children's songs
Traditional children's songs
Singing games
Year of song unknown
English nursery rhymes
1890s songs
Songwriter unknown